Superpallo (in English: Bouncy Ball) is the fifth studio album by Finnish pop rock singer-songwriter Maija Vilkkumaa, released by Warner Music in Finland digitally on 29 September 2008. The album debuted at number one upon release on the Finnish Albums Chart and charted for 16 weeks in two runs up to 2009. With sales of over 19,000 copies to date, the record has been awarded a gold certification in Finland.

Singles
During 2008, three singles were released from Superpallo, "Suojatiellä" on 16 June, "Luokkakokous" on 30 August and "Mä haluun naimisiin" on 22 December.

Track listing

Charts and certifications

Weekly charts

Year-end charts

Certifications

References

2008 albums
Maija Vilkkumaa albums
Finnish-language albums